is a Japanese physicist, known for neutrino experiments at the Kamioka Observatory – Kamiokande and its successor, Super-Kamiokande. In 2015, he was awarded the Nobel Prize in Physics jointly with Canadian physicist Arthur B. McDonald. On 1 October 2020, he became the president of the Science Council of Japan.

Early life and education
Kajita was born in 1959 in Higashimatsuyama, Saitama, Japan. He liked studying thought rather than memorizing, especially with interest in physics, biology, world history, Japanese history, and earth science in high school. He studied physics at Saitama University and graduated in 1981. He received his doctorate in 1986 at the University of Tokyo. At the University of Tokyo, he joined Masatoshi Koshiba's research group because neutrinos "seemed like they might be interesting."

Career and research 
Since 1988, Kajita has been at the Institute for Cosmic Radiation Research, University of Tokyo, where he became an assistant professor in 1992 and professor in 1999.

He became director of the Center for Cosmic Neutrinos at the Institute for Cosmic Ray Research (ICRR) in 1999. , he is a Principal Investigator at the Institute for the Physics and Mathematics of the Universe in Tokyo, and Director of ICRR.

In 1998, Kajita's team at the Super-Kamiokande found that when cosmic rays hit the Earth's atmosphere, the resulting neutrinos switched between two flavours before they reached the detector under Mt. Kamioka. This discovery helped prove the existence of neutrino oscillation and that neutrinos have mass. In 2015, Kajita shared the Nobel Prize in Physics with Canadian physicist Arthur McDonald, whose Sudbury Neutrino Observatory discovered similar results. Kajita's and McDonald's work solved the longstanding Solar neutrino problem, which was a major discrepancy between the predicted and measured Solar neutrino fluxes, and indicated that the Standard Model, which required neutrinos to be massless, had weaknesses. In a news conference at the University of Tokyo, shortly after the Nobel announcement, Kajita said, "I want to thank the neutrinos, of course. And since neutrinos are created by cosmic rays, I want to thank them, too."

One of the first people Kajita called after receiving the Nobel Prize was 2002 Nobel physics laureate Masatoshi Koshiba, his former mentor and a fellow neutrino researcher.

Kajita is currently the principal investigator of another ICRR project located at the Kamioka Observatory, the KAGRA gravitational wave detector.

Recognition

Awards 
1987 – Asahi Prize as part of Kamiokande (Representative – Masatoshi Koshiba)
1989 – Bruno Rossi Prize along with the other members of the Kamiokande collaboration
1998 – Asahi Prize as part of Super-Kamiokande (Representative – Yoji Totsuka)
1999 – Nishina Memorial Prize
2002 – Panofsky Prize for compelling experimental evidence for neutrino oscillations using atmospheric neutrinos
2010 – Yoji Totsuka Award
2012 – Japan Academy Prize for "Discovery of Atmospheric Neutrino Oscillations"
2013 – Julius Wess Award for his "significant role in the Discovery of Atmospheric Neutrino Oscillations with the Super-KAMIOKANDE Experiment."
2015 – Nobel Prize in Physics jointly with Arthur B. McDonald for the discovery of neutrino oscillations, which shows that neutrinos have mass.
2016 – Fundamental Physics Prize

Honors 
2015 – Order of Culture, Person of Cultural Merit
2016 – Doctorate in Science (DSc), Aligarh Muslim University, India
2016 – Honoris Causa Degree, Higher University of San Andrés, La Paz, Bolivia.
2017 – Honoris Causa Degree in Physics, University of Naples Federico II
2017 – Honoris Causa Degree in Physics, University of Bern
2017 – Honoris Causa Degree in Physics, University of Perugia

See also 
List of Japanese Nobel laureates
List of Nobel laureates affiliated with the University of Tokyo
Masatoshi Koshiba
Yoji Totsuka

References

External links 
 
 Panofsky Preis
 Verleihung des Julius Wess Preises 2013 mit Vortrag von Kajita
 KAGRA, the Latest "Gravitational Wave Telescope" Project, Commences via JST Science News 2012
 Takaaki Kajita Quotes With Pictures
 Interview with Takaaki Kajita, on Editage Insights: In my days, nobody felt rushed just because research was making slow progress
 

1959 births
Living people
Japanese physicists
Nobel laureates in Physics
Japanese Nobel laureates
People from Saitama Prefecture
Saitama University alumni
University of Tokyo alumni
Academic staff of the University of Tokyo
Recipients of the Order of Culture
Persons of Cultural Merit
Cosmic ray physicists
20th-century Japanese scientists
21st-century Japanese scientists
Winners of the Panofsky Prize
Foreign Members of the Russian Academy of Sciences